Plurality of worlds may refer to:

Cosmic pluralism, belief in numerous "worlds" which may harbour extraterrestrial life
Conversations on the Plurality of Worlds, a 1686 book by Bernard Le Bovier de Fontenelle
Of the Plurality of Worlds, an 1853 essay by William Whewell
On the Plurality of Worlds, a 1986 book by David Lewis
Plurality of Worlds (album), an album by PeroxWhy?Gen